Casuarina cristata is an Australian tree of the sheoak family Casuarinaceae known as belah. It is native to a band across inland eastern Australia.

Taxonomy
The Dutch botanist Friedrich Anton Wilhelm Miquel described the belah in 1848, and it still bears its original name. It is called Muurrgu or Murrgu in the Yuwaalaraay dialect of the Gamilaraay language around Walgett in northwestern New South Wales. Belah is an aboriginal name; other common names include scaly-barked casuarina, scrub she-oak, billa, ngaree, bulloak and swamp oak.

Description
Belah grows as a tree reaching  in height and has a 
The tree has a dark greyish brown scaly bark, and its pendulous branches having a weeping habit. The true leaves are tiny scales along the branchlets.

Distribution and habitat
The range is from Clermont in central Queensland south through to Temora in southern New South Wales. It is an important component of the endangered Brigalow ecological community of inland New South Wales and Queensland. Here it is found as a dominant tree with brigalow (Acacia harpophylla), black gidyea (A. argyrodendron), bimble box (Eucalyptus populnea), Dawson River blackbutt (E. cambageana), E. pilligaensis and the smaller trees such as wilga (Geijera parviflora) and false sandalwood (Eremophila mitchellii) in open forest over mainly Cenozoic clay plains. Other plants it grows with include bonaree (Alectryon oleifolius), sugarwood (Myoporum platycarpum) and nelia (Acacia loderi). On limestone-based soils, it may have a dense understory composed of pearl bluebush (Maireana sedifolia) or black bluebush (M. pyramidata)

Ecology
Belah can reproduce by suckering from its root system, and clonal stands have been recorded. Seedlings only appear after periods of high rainfall.

References

cristata
Fagales of Australia
Trees of Australia
Flora of New South Wales
Flora of Queensland
Taxa named by Friedrich Anton Wilhelm Miquel